Communist Party of Guatemala may refer to:

Communist Party of Guatemala (1922–1932)
Guatemalan Party of Labour (1949–1998), known in its early days as the "Communist Party of Guatemala".